Ricardo Basta (born in Buenos Aires, Argentina) is an Argentine American jewelry designer based in Southern California and is known for sourcing only ethically mined gems and diamonds.

Early Years and Education 
Ricardo Basta was born and raised in Buenos Aires, Argentina.  At the age of 19, Basta moved to the United States. He arrived in Los Angeles, California and is a third generation jeweler. He began working for his uncle who owned and was a European trained master jeweler and expert in restoration who operated a jewelry store. Basta began by sweeping floors and eventually apprenticed with European-trained jewelers.

Career 
Early in his career, Basta began working for a high-end retailer in Beverly Hills that specialized in antique estate pieces, known as Frances Klein. There Basta restored and designed pieces from the Victorian, Edwardian, and Art Deco periods. Basta gained an appreciation of the designs and craftsmanship which in turn inspired his own creations.

Aside from his craftsmanship, Basta has become known for his engineering innovations.  Much of his jewelry is created with built-in movement. Basta created a pair of earrings with alternating sapphires, tanzanites, garnets, rubies, and diamonds set with ball-bearings in between each section allowing the entire length of the piece to spin independently.

Basta has also become recognized in his field as a platinum expert. In 1986 when information was scarce on the subject, he began to cast in platinum and began to research and study the properties of platinum. Most design houses weren’t using platinum quite yet. Through the process of trial and error, he developed an understanding of the best way to work with the precious metal. Since then, the learning curve has decreased due to the popularity of the metal and the development of resources, equipment and technology. Also, due to his experience with platinum, he has written contributing articles for the  Platinum Guild International on the subjects of casting and antique jewelry restoration, as well as articles on designing and manufacturing in platinum.

In 2004 Basta started his own brand. He is based in Century City on Santa Monica Blvd.

In 2005 Basta served as judge at the AGTA Spectrum Awards.

In 2007, Ricardo Basta was approached by Alessandra Gallo Jewellery with designer Kristin Keller, to create a tear drop pin to raise awareness about conflict diamonds and their impact on child soldiers.  Ricardo Basta handmade and donated labor and materials for the creation of The Blood Diamond Pin, made for actors Leonardo DiCaprio, Ryan Gosling, and Djimon Hounsou, and director, Ed Zwick to wear to the 2007 Oscars Ceremony in support of Amnesty International Campaigns on Child Soldiers and Conflict Diamonds.

In 2017, Ricardo Basta was accepted into the prestigious group, AJDC (American Jewelry Design Council).

Exhibitions 
From 2007 until 2010, Basta had his first exhibition at the Carnegie Museum of Natural History in Pittsburgh, Pennsylvania. There he participated in a group exhibition entitled: Luxe Life: Masterpieces of American Jewelry. The exhibit featured extravagant pieces of jewelry, ranging in age from mid-19th-century to modern.  Basta displayed two pieces for the exhibition: a snowflake brooch and a seahorse brooch.

That same year, Basta had his first solo show exhibiting one-of-a-kind brooches at the Gemological Institute of America Museum in Carlsbad, California. The show included pieces made with green sapphire, fire opal, platinum, diamonds, gold, mother-of-pearl, ivory and elephant hair.

In 2018, Basta had several of his pieces featured in the Headley-Whitney Museum of Art with The American Jewelry Design Council.

Awards 
2000 AGTA Award
2002 AGTA Spectrum Awards - Evening Platinum Honors
2003 MJSA Vision Award
2004 AGTA Spectrum Awards - 1st Place Bridal Wear
2004 AGTA Spectrum Awards - Honorable Mention Casual Wear
2004 MJSA Vision Award
2005 AGTA Award
2008 AGTA Spectrum Awards - 1st Place Evening Wear
2009 AGTA Spectrum Awards - 1st Place Men's Wear
2009 AGTA Spectrum Awards - Manufacturing Honors Men's Wear
2012 AGTA Award
2014 AGTA Spectrum Awards - Manufacturing Honors Business/Day Wear
2014 Excellence in Service Award by Jewelers 24Karat Club of Southern California
2016 AGTA Spectrum Awards - 1st Place Business/Day Wear
2016 AGTA Spectrum Awards - 2nd Place Evening Wear
2016 Summer AGTA Spectrum Awards - 1st Place Business/Day Wear
2016 Summer AGTA Spectrum Awards - 1st Place Bridal Wear / Platinum honors
2016 JA CASE Awards - 1st Place Jewelry $5,001 - $10,000
2017 JA CASE Awards - Honorable Mention
2017 MJSA Vision Award - CAD / CAM Distinction
2017 AGTA Spectrum Awards - 1st Place Men's Wear
2017 AGTA Spectrum Awards - 1st Place Bridal Wear
2017 AGTA Spectrum Awards - Manufacturing Honors
2017 Rio Grande Saul Bell Awards - Finalist
2018 Rio Grande Saul Bell Awards - Finalist
2018 JA CASE Awards - 1st Place $2,001 - $5,000
2018 AGTA Spectrum Awards - Best Use of Color
2018 AGTA Spectrum Awards - 2nd Place Bridal Wear
2019 AGTA Award

Features 
February 2016 - The Real features Ricardo Basta Fine Jewelry in surprise proposal segment
May 2017 - VoyageLA features Ricardo Basta Fine Jewelry 
August 2017 - National Jeweler Piece of the Week feature
September 2017 - Cosmopolitan Turkey features Ricardo Basta Fine Jewelry 
November 2017 - This is LA features Ricardo Basta Fine Jewelry
December 2017 - Lucy's Magazine features Ricardo Basta Fine Jewelry (pages 108 - 113)
January 2018 - Rapper Evander Griiim shops at Ricardo Basta Fine Jewelry with Complex
August 2018 - Savannah James wearing Ricardo Basta Fine Jewelry for Nike campaign with Lebron James

Bibliography 
 Basta, Ricardo and Maerz, Jurgen J. "Casting Gold to Platinum", Platinum Guild International 
 Basta, Ricardo "Restoration of Antique and Period Jewelry", Platinum Manufacturing Process, Platinum Day Symposium Vol. IX N2. Print.

References 

American jewelry designers
American jewellers
Argentine artists
Living people
Year of birth missing (living people)